A sexual network is a social network that is defined by the sexual relationships within a set of individuals.

Studies and discoveries
Like other forms of social networks, sexual networks can be formally studied using the mathematics of graph theory and network theory.

Recent epidemiological studies  have investigated sexual networks, and suggest that the statistical properties of sexual networks are crucial to the spread of sexually transmitted diseases (STDs). Sub-graphs, both large and small, can be defined within the overall sexual network graph; for example, people who frequent particular bars or clubs, belong to a particular ethnic group or take part in a particular type of sexual activity, or are part of a particular outbreak of an STD.  In particular, assortative mixing between people with large numbers of sexual partners seems to be an important factor in the spread of STD.

In a surprising result, mathematical models predict that the sexual network graph for the human race appears to have a single giant component that indirectly links almost all people who have had more than one sexual partner, and a great many of those who have had only one sexual partner (if their one sexual partner was themselves part of the giant component). .

For more detailed epidemiological work, the time sequence of sexual contacts is important.

See also 
 Bugchasing
 Contact tracing
 Small world experiment
 Social network
 Transmission risks and rates

References

Further reading
 M Kretzschmar. "Sexual network structure and sexually transmitted disease prevention: a modeling perspective". Sexually Transmitted Diseases volume 27, number 10 (November 2000): pages 627– 35.
 

 L E C Rocha, F Liljeros and P Holme Information dynamics shape the sexual networks of Internet-mediated prostitution. Proceedings of the National Academy of Sciences free online (March 2010).

Nyanzi, S., Nyanzi, B., Kalina, B., & Pool, R. (n.d). Mobility, sexual networks and exchange among bodabodamen in southwest Uganda. Taylor & Francis Ltd. Retrieved from EBSCOhost.

External links 
 Researchers map the sexual network of an entire high school
 Patterns of prostitution captured in social network

Social networks
Epidemiology
Sexuality and society
Sexual health